Eliyahu Matza (4 January 1935 – 29 October 2021) was an Israeli judge. He was a justice of the Supreme Court of Israel from 1991 to 2005.

References 

1935 births
2021 deaths
20th-century Israeli judges
Judges of the Supreme Court of Israel
People from Tel Aviv
21st-century Israeli judges